Solomon Islands has competed at eight Commonwealth Games, making their first appearance in 1982. They did not send a team in 1986, but have appeared at every Games since 1990. The Solomons' first Commonwealth Games medal was won in 2018 by weightlifter Jenly Tegu Wini.

Overall Medal Tally

List of medalists

References

 
Nations at the Commonwealth Games